This is a list of all orienteering clubs found in Wikipedia.

B 
 IL i BUL, Norway, Oslo, won the first Norwegian relay championship in Orienteering in 1946
 Bækkelagets SK, Norway, Oslo, won the Jukola relay in 1988, 1999 and 2002

C 
 Cambridge Sports Union, Cambridge, Massachusetts
 Club Orientació Catalunya, Barcelona, Catalunya

D 
 Delaware Valley Orienteering Association, Pennsylvania, United States

E 
 English Orienteering Council

F 
 Florø TIF, Norway, Florø
 Fossum IF, Norway, Bærum

G 
 Garingal Orienteers, Australia, Sydney
 Goldseekers Orienteering, Orange, NSW, Australia
 Gruppo sportivo Pavione (Pavione sportive group), Italy, Imer
 IFK Göteborg, Gothenburg, Sweden

H 
 Halden SK, Norway, Halden

K 
 Kalevan Rasti, Finland, Joensuu
 Kristiansand OK, Norway, Kristiansand

L 
 Lev Hasharon - Menashe OC, Israel

M 
 Mälarhöjdens IK, Sweden

N 
 Navi, Finland, Mikkeli
 Nesodden IF, Norway, Nesodden
 New England Orienteering Club
 NSW Orienteering Association, NSW, Australia 
 Nordstrand IF, Norway
 Northeast Ohio Orienteering Club, Ohio, United States
 NTNUI, Norway, Trondheim, is the largest sports club in Norway with more than 10,000 members

O 
 Ottawa Orienteering Club, Canada, Ottawa

P 
 Potteries Orienteering Club, West Midlands, Great Britain

S 
 South London Orienteers and Wayfarers, United Kingdom, London
 Spårvägens GoIF, Sweden, Stockholm
 IF Sturla, Norway, Drammen
 South Florida Orienteering, Florida, USA

T 
 OK Tyr, Sweden, Karlstad, won Tiomila 1989 and 1990
 IL Tyrving, Norway, Sandvika
 Thames Valley Orienteering Club, Buckinghamshire and Oxfordshire, UK (UK Orienteering Club of the Year 2015)

V 
 TIF Viking, Norway, Bergenhus

See also 
 Scottish Orienteering Association, a constituent association of the British Orienteering Federation

References

Orienteering
 
Orienteering